The Women's 50m Freestyle event at the 10th FINA World Aquatics Championships swam on 26–27 July 2003 in Barcelona, Spain. Preliminary and semifinal heats swam on July 26, while the Final swam on July 27.

Prior to the event, the World (WR) and Championship (CR) records were:
WR: 24.13 swum by Inge de Bruijn (Netherlands) on September 22, 2000 in Sydney, Australia
CR: 24.45 swum by Inge de Bruijn (Netherlands) on July 28, 2001 in Fukuoka, Japan

Results

Final

Semifinals

Preliminaries

References

Swimming at the 2003 World Aquatics Championships
2003 in women's swimming